Queen Sinui (Hangul: 신의왕후 한씨, Hanja: 神懿王后 韓氏; 1337 – 21 October 1391), of the Cheongju Han clan, was the first wife of Yi Seong-gye (future Taejo of Joseon). She was the mother of King Jeongjong and King Taejong.

She was firstly given the title of Queen Jeol (절비, 節妃) in 1393. After her second son (Yi Bang-gwa) became King, she was posthumously honored as Queen Sinui (신의왕후, 神懿王后). In 1899, after the founding of the Korean Empire, she was posthumously called Sinui, the High Empress (신의고황후, 神懿高皇后).

Biography

Early life
The future Queen Sinui was born during King Chungsuk of Goryeo’s 5th year of reign in September 1337. Born into the Cheongju Han clan, Lady Han was the eldest child within seven siblings to Han Gyeong and his wife, Lady Shin of the Saknyeong Shin clan. 

In some sources, she is noted as a member of the Anbyeon Han clan, which was founded by Han Ryeon (한련, 韓漣), a ninth-generation descendant of Han Ran (한란, 韓蘭), the progenitor of the Cheongju Han clan.

Marriage and later life
In 1351, when she was 15 years old, she was arranged to marry Yi Seong-gye who was 2 years older than her. She later gave birth to 6 sons and 2 daughters from 1354 to 1370s. While Yi Seong-gye (later Yi Dan) was traveling through the battlefield, Lady Han took care of the household affairs in his hometown and helped out. 

During the Goryeo Dynasty, aristocratic men were allowed two wives; one wife was known as the Gyeongcheo (경처), the capital wife, while the second wife was known as the Hyangcheo (향처), the countryside wife. In Gaegyeong (modern-day Kaeseong), Yi Seong-gye welcomed Lady Kang, a daughter of Kang Yun-seong, from the noble Goksan Kang clan, as his second, Gyeongcheo, wife. Lady Kang would later become Queen Hyeon.

In 1388, during the 14th year of King U of Goryeo’s reign, Lady Han stayed in Jaebyeok-dong, Pocheon, and fled back to Dongbuk-myeon with her children and remaining family under the guidance of her fifth son Yi Bang-won. This eventually led her to be concerned about the threat of her life and she later passed away on 21 October 1391. Her tomb is called Jeneung and is located in present-day Kaesong, North Korea.

Aftermath 
A year after Lady Han’s death, her husband established the Joseon Dynasty; thus having her husband become king and her children become princes and princesses.

During King Taejo’s 2nd year of reign in 1393, she was posthumously given the title of Queen Jeol (절비, 節妃; Jeolbi meaning Faithful Consort). In 1398, during the first year of reign of her second eldest son, King Jeongjong, Lady Han was honored as Queen Sinui (신의왕후, 神懿王后).

After the death of Queen Hyeon, Queen Shinui's fifth son, Yi Bang-won, eventually led a coup d'etat with his wife, Princess Jeongnyeong’s encouragement, while King Taejo was in mourning for his second wife. This event led to the deaths of Jeong Do-jeon and his supporters, as well as the late Queen Sindeok's two sons (Yi Bang-beon, Grand Prince Muan and Yi Bang-seok, Grand Prince Uian). This incident became known as the First Strife of Princes.

Family
Father: Han Gyeong, Internal Prince Ancheon (한경 안천부원군, 韓卿 安川府院君)
Grandfather: Han Gyu-in (한규인, 韓珪仁)
Great-grandfather: Han Yu (한유, 韓裕)
Great-great-grandfather: Han Yeon (한연, 韓淵)
Mother: Grand Lady of Samhan State of the Saknyeong Shin clan (삼한국대부인 삭녕 신씨, 三韓國大夫人 朔寧 申氏)
Grandfather: Shin Yun-ryeo (신윤려, 申允麗)
Sibling(s):
 Younger brother: Han Seong-gi, Prince Ansan (안산군 한성기, 安山君 韓成己)
 Younger brother: Han Chang-su, Duke Yangjeong, Prince Anwon (양정공 안원군 한창수) (1365 – 1440)
 Younger brother: Han Geum-gang (한금강, 韓金剛) (? – 1433)
 Sister-in-law: Lady Mun of the Nampyeong Mun clan (남평 문씨, 南平 文氏)
 Younger brother: Han Yung-jeon (한융전, 韓隆田) (1368 – 1442)
 Sister-in-law: Lady Yi (이씨, 李氏)
 Younger brother: Han Geom, Duke Yangjeong, Prince Ancheon (양정공 안천군 한검, 良精公 安川君 韓劍) (? – 1433)
 Younger sister: Lady Han of the Cheongju Han clan (한씨, 韓氏)
 Brother-in-law: Mun Won-jwa of the Nampyeong Mun clan (문원좌, 文原佐)

Husband: Yi Seong-gye, King Taejo of Joseon (조선 태조 이성계) (27 October 1335 – 18 June 1408)
Father-in-law: King Hwanjo of Joseon (환조대왕) (20 January 1315 – 3 June 1361)
Mother-in-law: Queen Uihye of the Yeongheung Choe clan (의혜왕후 최씨)

Issue(s):
Son: Yi Bang-woo, Grand Prince Jinan (진안대군 이방우) (1354 – 15 January 1394)
Daughter-in-law: Lady Ji of the Chungju Ji clan (충주 지씨)
Grandson: Yi Bok-geun, Prince Bongnyeong (봉녕군 이복근)
Granddaughter: Princess Gyeonghye (경혜옹주)
Great-grandson: Yi Won-jeung (이원증)
Great-grandson: Yi Hyeong-jeung (이형증)
Son: Yi Bang-gwa, Grand Prince Yeongan (영안대군 이방과) (18 July 1357 – 15 October 1419)
Daughter-in-law: Queen Jeongan of the Gyeongju Kim clan (정안왕후 김씨) (22 January 1355 – 2 August 1412)
Son: Yi Bang-ui, Grand Prince Ikan (익안대군 이방의) (1360 – 26 September 1404)
Daughter-in-law: Lady Choe of the Dongju Choe clan (동주 최씨)
Grandson: Yi Seok-geun, Duke Anryang, Internal Prince Ikpyeong (안량공 익평부원군 이석근)
Granddaughter-in-law: Lady Kim of the Gyeongju Kim clan (경주 김씨)
Granddaughter-in-law: Lady Kim (김씨)
Granddaughter: Princess Hoein (회인현주)
Grandson-in-law: Kim Han (김한)
Great-grandson: Kim Yu-don (김유돈)
Great-granddaughter-in-law: Lady Kim of the Yeonan Kim clan (연안 김씨)
Great-grandson: Kim Yu-jang (김유장)
Great-granddaughter-in-law: Lady Shin of the Pyeongsan Shin clan (평산 신씨)
Great-granddaughter: Lady Kim (김씨)
Great-granddaughter: Lady Kim (김씨)
Granddaughter: Lady Yi of the Jeonju Yi clan
Son: Yi Bang-gan, Grand Prince Hoean (회안대군 이방간) (2 July 1364 – 10 April 1421)
Daughter-in-law: Internal Princess Consort Min of the Yeoheung Min clan (삼한국대부인 여흥 민씨, 三韓國大夫人 驪興 閔氏) (? - 1407)
Grandson: Yi Maeng-jung, Prince Uiryeong (의령군 이맹중) (15 February 1385 - 11 July 1423)
Granddaughter-in-law: Lady Han of the Cheongju Han clan (청주 한씨); daughter of Han Gi (한기, 韓琦)
Great-grandson: Yi On, Prince Yeongpyeong (영평군 이온)
Granddaughter: Lady Yi of the Jeonju Yi clan
 Grandson-in-law: Lee Dae-saeng (이대생, 李大生) of the Anseong Lee clan 
 Daughter-in-law: Internal Princess Consort Hwang of the Miryang Hwang clan (삼한국대부인 밀양 황씨, 三韓國大夫人 密陽 黃氏)
 Grandson: Yi Tae, Prince Changnyeong (창녕군 이태) (1389 - 15 October 1451)
Granddaughter: Princess Seonghye (성혜옹주, 誠惠翁主) (? - 1431)
Grandson-in-law: Jo Shin-eon (조신언, 趙愼言) of the Pyeongyang Jo clan
Granddaughter: Princess Shinhye (신혜옹주, 信惠翁主)
Grandson-in-law: Lee Dae-saeng (이대생, 李大生) of the Anseong Lee clan
Granddaughter: Princess Yanghye (양혜옹주)
 Daughter-in-law: Princess Consort Geumreung of the Gimpo Kim clan (금릉부부인 김포 금씨, 金陵府夫人 金浦琴氏)
 Grandson: Yi Seon, Prince Geumseong (금성군 이선) (1409 - ?)
 Grandson: Yi Jong-gun, Prince Geumsan (금산군 이중군) (9 February 1413 -  18 September 1478)
 Granddaughter-in-law: Princess Consort Jo of the Jangheung Jo clan (부부인 장흥 조씨) (13 March 1410 - 29 April 1484)
Son: Yi Bang-won, Grand Prince Jeongan (정안대군 이방원) (13 June 1367 – 30 May 1422)
Daughter-in-law: Queen Wongyeong of the Yeoheung Min clan (원경왕후 민씨)
Granddaughter: Princess Jeongsun (정순공주) (1385 – 25 August 1460)
Grandson-in-law: Yi Baek-gang, Duke Jeongjeol, Internal Prince Cheongpyeong (정절공 청평부원군 이백강) (1381 – 1451)
Great-granddaughter: Lady Yi of the Cheongju Yi clan (정경부인 청주 이씨)
Great-grandson-in-law: Yi Gye-rin, Duke Gongmu, Prince Hansan (1401 – 1455) (공무공 한산군 이계린)
Great-great-granddaughter: Lady Yi of the Hansan Yi clan
Granddaughter: Princess Gyeongjeong (경정공주) (1387 – 6 June 1455)
Grandson-in-law: Jo Dae-rim, Internal Prince Pyeongyang (평양부원군 조대림) (1387 – 1430)
Great-granddaughter: Lady Jo (조씨)
Great-granddaughter: Lady Jo (조씨)
Great-granddaughter: Lady Jo (조씨)
Great-granddaughter: Lady Jo (조씨)
Great-grandson: Jo Mu-yeong (조무영)
Great-granddaughter-in-law: Lady Nam of the Uiryeong Nam clan
Granddaughter: Princess Gyeongan (경안공주) (1393 – 30 May 1415)
Grandson-in-law: Gwon Gyu, Prince Gilchang (길창군 권규) (1393 – 1421)
Great-grandson: Gwon Dam (권담) (? – 1439)
Great-granddaughter-in-law: Lady Park of the Hamyang Park clan (함양 박씨)
Great-granddaughter-in-law: Lady Jeong of the Yeonil Jeong clan (연일 정씨)
Great-grandson: Gwon Chong, Duke Yeongjeong (영정공 권총) (1413 – 1480)
Great-granddaughter-in-law: Lady Choe of the Jeonju Choe clan (전주 최씨)
Grandson: Yi Je, Grand Prince Yangnyeong (양녕대군 이제) (1394 – 7 September 1462)
Granddaughter-in-law: Princess Consort Suseong of the Gwangsan Kim clan (수성부부인 광산김씨)
Great-grandson: Yi Gae, Duke Huian, Prince Sunseong (? - 2 September 1462) (희안공 순성군 이개)
Great-granddaughter-in-law: Lady Shin (신씨) (? – 27 November 1453)
Great-grandson: Yi Po, Duke Yian, Prince Hamyang (이안공 함양군 이포) (1417 – 21 June 1475)
Great-granddaughter-in-law: Princess Consort Taein of the Yi clan (태인군부인 이씨)
Great-grandson: Yi Hye, Prince Seosan (이혜 서산군) (? – 10 April 1451)
Great-granddaughter-in-law: Princess Consort Yangcheon of the Kim clan (양천현부인 김씨) (? – 5 June 1464)
Great-granddaughter: Princess Yeongcheon (영천군주) (1412 – 5 April 1442)
Great-granddaughter: Lady Yi of the Jeonju Yi clan
Great-granddaughter: Princess Yeongpyeong (영평현주)
Great-grandson-in-law: Kim Cheol-gyun (김철균)
Great-granddaughter: Lady Yi of the Jeonju Yi clan
Great-grandson-in-law: Park Su-jong (박수종)
Great-granddaughter: Princess Jaeryeong (재령군주) (? – 1444)
Great-grandson-in-law: Yi Ja (이자)
Grandson: Yi Bo, Grand Prince Hyoryeong (효령대군 이보) (6 January 1396 – 12 June 1486)
Granddaughter-in-law: Grand Princess Consort Yeseong of the Haeju Jeong clan (예성부부인 해주 정씨) (1394 – 1470) 
Great-grandson: Yi Chae, Prince Uiseong (1411 – 1493) (의성군 이채)
Great-granddaughter-in-law: Princess Consort Hoein of the Seongju Yi clan (회인군부인 성주이씨)
Great-grandson: Yi Chin, Prince Seowon (서원군 이친) (1413 – 1475)
Great-granddaughter-in-law: Princess Consort Uiryeong of the Gyeongju Yi clan (의령군부인 경주이씨)
Great-grandson: Yi Gap, Prince Boseong (보성군 이갑) (1416 – 1499)
Great-granddaughter-in-law: Lady Yi (이씨)
Great-grandson: Yi Mil, Prince Nakan (낙안군 이밀) (1417 – 1474)
Great-granddaughter-in-law: Princess Consort Yangsan of the Onyang Kim clan (양산군부인 언양 김씨)
Great-grandson: Yi Jeong, Prince Yeongcheon (영천군 이정) (1422 – ?)
Great-granddaughter-in-law: Princess Consort Gwon of the Yecheon Gwon clan (군부인 예천 권씨)
Great-grandson: Yi Ui, Prince Woncheon (원천군 이의) (1423 – 1476)
Great-granddaughter-in-law: Princess Consort Jo of the Baekcheon Jo clan (군부인 백천 조씨)
Great-granddaughter-in-law: Princess Consort Jo of the Hanyang Jo clan (군부인 한양 조씨)
Grandson: Yi Do, Grand Prince Chungnyeong (충녕대군 이도) (15 May 1397 – 8 April 1450)
Granddaughter-in-law: Queen Soheon of the Cheongseong Shim clan (12 October 1395 – 19 April 1446) (소헌왕후 심씨)
Great-granddaughter: Princess Jeongso (정소공주) (1412 – 1424)
Great-grandson: Crown Prince Yi Hyang (왕세자 이향) (15 November 1414 – 1 June 1452)
Great-granddaughter-in-law: Crown Princess Hwi of the Andong Kim clan (휘빈 김씨) (1410 – 1429)
Great-granddaughter-in-law: Crown Princess Sun of the Haeum Bong clan (순빈 봉씨) (1414 – 1436)
Great-granddaughter-in-law: Queen Hyeondeok of the Andong Gwon clan (현덕왕후 권씨) (17 April 1418 – 10 August 1441)
Great-granddaughter: Princess Jeongui (정의공주) (1415 – 1477)
Great-grandson-in-law: Ahn Maeng-dam, Duke Yanghyo, Prince Yeonchang (양효공 연창군 안맹담) (1415 – 1462)
Great-grandson: Yi Yu, Grand Prince Suyang (수양대군 이유) (2 November 1417 – 23 September 1468)
Great-granddaughter-in-law: Queen Jeonghui of the Papyeong Yun clan (정희왕후 윤씨) (8 December 1418 – 6 May 1483)
Great-grandson: Yi Yong, Grand Prince Anpyeong (안평대군 이용) (18 October 1418 – 18 November 1453)
Great-granddaughter-in-law: Princess Consort Jeong of the Yeonil Jeong clan (부부인 영일 정씨) (? – 31 May 1453)
Great-grandson: Yi Gu, Grand Prince Imyeong (임영대군 이구) (6 January 1420 – 21 January 1469)
Great-granddaughter-in-law: Princess Consort Nam of the Uiryeong Nam clan
Great-granddaughter-n-law: Princess Consort Jean of the Jeonju Choe clan (제안부부인 전주 최씨)
Great-granddaughter-in-law: Princess Consort Ahn of the Andong Ahn clan (부부인 안동 안씨)
Great-grandson: Yi Yeo, Grand Prince Gwangpyeong (광평대군 이여) (2 May 1425 – 7 December 1444)
Great-granddaughter-in-law: Princess Consort Yeongga of the Pyeongsan Shin clan (영가부부인 평산 신씨)
Great-grandson: Yi Yu, Grand Prince Geumseong (금성대군 이유) (5 May 1426 – 7 November 1457)
Great-granddaughter-in-law: Princess Consort Wansan of the Jeonju Choe clan (완산부부인 전주 최씨)
Great-grandson: Yi Im, Grand Prince Pyeongwon (평원대군 이임) (18 November 1427 – 16 January 1445)
Great-granddaughter-in-law: Princess Consort Gangnyeong of the Namyang Hong clan (강녕부부인 남양 홍씨) (? – 1483)
Great-granddaughter-in-law: Princess Consort Daebang of the Yeosan Song clan (대방부부인 송씨) (? – 1507)
Great-granddaughter-in-law: Princess Consort Chunseong of the Jeong clan (춘성부부인 정씨)
Great-granddaughter-in-law: Princess Consort Yeonseong of the Kim clan (연성부부인 김씨)
Granddaughter: Princess Jeongseon (정선공주) (1404 – 25 February 1424)
Grandson-in-law: Nam Hwi, Prince Consort Uisan (의산위 남휘) (? – 1454)
Great-grandson: Nam Bin (남빈)
Great-granddaughter-in-law: Lady Hong of the Namyang Hong clan (남양 홍씨)
Great-granddaughter: Lady Nam (남씨)
Grandson: Yi Jong, Grand Prince Seongnyeong (성녕대군 이종) (3 August 1405 – 11 April 1418)
Granddaughter-in-law: Lady Seong of the Changnyeong Seong clan (창녕 성씨)
 Unnamed grandson
 Unnamed grandson 
 Unnamed grandson 
 Unnamed grandson (1412 - 1412)
Son: Yi Bang-yeon, Grand Prince Deokan (덕안대군 이방연)
 Adoptive grandson: Yi Jung-gun, Prince Geumsan (금산군 이중군) (9 February 1413 - 18 September 1478)
Daughter: Princess Gyeongsin (경신공주) (? – 29 April 1426)
Son-in-law: Yi Baek-gyeong, Internal Prince Sangdang (상당부원군 이백경) of the Cheongju Yi clan (1363 - 1414)
Grandson: Yi Bi (이비, 李俾)
Grandson: Yi Hu (이후) (? - 1428)
Granddaughter-in-law: Lady Yi of the Hansan Yi clan (한산 이씨)
Daughter: Princess Gyeongseon (경선공주)
Son-in-law: Sim Jong, Prince Cheongwon (청원군 심종) (? – 1418)
Granddaughter: Lady Sim of the Cheongsong Sim clan (청송 심씨)
Grandson-in-law: Yi Myeong-sin, Duke Gangpyeong (강평공 이명신) (1392 – 1459)
Great-Grandson: Yi Chu (이추, 李抽) (1417 - ?)

In popular culture
 Portrayed by Tae Hyun-shil in the 1983 KBS TV series Foundation of the Kingdom.
 Portrayed by Kim So-won in the 1983 MBC TV series The King of Chudong Palace.
 Portrayed by Han Young-Sook in the 1996 KBS TV series Tears of the Dragon.
 Portrayed by Lee Duk-hee in the 2021 KBS1 TV series The King of Tears, Lee Bang-won.

References

1337 births
1391 deaths
Royal consorts of the Joseon dynasty
Korean queens consort
14th-century Korean people
14th-century Korean women
People from Kumya County